Kenebri is a locality in northern New South Wales, Australia.

Kenebri is located between Baradine  and Gwabegar on the road from  Coonabarabran.

The Gwabegar railway line reached Kenebri in 1923 and a station and siding were opened.  Kenebri was the source of rail sleepers.  
Kenebri Post Office opened on 1 March 1929 and closed in 1984.

The Gwabegar line was closed north of Binnaway in 2005.

Kenebri is located in the Pilliga forest and there were timber harvesting activities there. Kenebri also had a public school at one time, which is now closed.  The nearest extant town to Kenebri is Baradine.

At the 2006 census, Kenebri and the surrounding area had a population of 142.

References

External links
Details of the former Kenebri railway station

Towns in New South Wales
Warrumbungle Shire